Luftfartsverket is the Scandinavian present or former name of:
Avinor (Norwegian Civil Aviation Administration)
Finavia (Finnish Civil Aviation Administration)
Swedish Civil Aviation Administration